Aminata Touré may refer to:
 Aminata Touré (Senegalese politician)
 Aminata Touré (German politician)
 Aminata Touré (Guinean politician)